Stone is an unincorporated community and coal town in Pike County, Kentucky, United States.  It was established in 1912.  Stone was a mining community named for Galen Stone, head of the Pond Creek Coal Company which was based in Stone.  In 1922 the Pond Creek Coal Company was sold to Fordson Coal Company, which was a subsidiary of Ford Motor Company.  In 1936 Fordson sold the mine at Stone to Eastern Coal Company.

Stone is located just across the Tug Fork from Williamson, West Virginia, upstream from Belfry, Kentucky, on Pond Creek.

References
Notes

Sources
University of Kentucky, Kentucky Atlas and Gazetteer entry
CoalCampUSA.com entry on Eastern Kentucky coalfields includes photos of Stone

Unincorporated communities in Kentucky
Unincorporated communities in Pike County, Kentucky
Populated places established in 1912
Company towns in Kentucky
Coal towns in Kentucky
1912 establishments in Kentucky